Čiližská Radvaň is a village and municipality in the Dunajská Streda District in the Trnava Region of south-west Slovakia.

Geography
The municipality lies at an altitude of 113 metres and covers an area of 21.412 km². It has a population of about 1,277 people.

History
In the 9th century, the territory of Čiližská Radvaň became part of the Kingdom of Hungary. The first mention of the village is from 1252 when it is mentioned in the Zobor Abbey’s land-registration as Villa Rodovan and Roduan. Until 1918, it belonged to Hungary. After the Austro-Hungarian army disintegrated in November 1918, Czechoslovakian troops occupied the area. After the Treaty of Trianon of 1920, it became officially part of Czechoslovakia and fell within Bratislava County until 1927. In November 1938, the First Vienna Award granted the area to Hungary and it was held by Hungary until 1945. After Soviet occupation in 1945, Czechoslovakian administration returned and the village became officially part of Czechoslovakia in 1947.

Demography 
According to the 2001 census, its total population was 1218, of whom 95,40% of the respondents reported themselves as Hungarian.

The Calvinist church 
The church of the village was first mentioned in a local legend, according to which the wife of King Béla IV of Hungary, being chased by Tartars, allegedly gave birth to a baby in a hedge near this church. The child was said to be baptized in the church. After this occasion, the king gave a privilege for the inhabitants of Radvány according to which, on entering the church, villagers from Radvány were entitled to use a gate different from the one that people from other villages had to use.

Originally, the church was built in Romanesque style which is proved by the remains of murals. However in the registration made upon the order of cardinal Peter Pázmány in the 17th century, the church was mentioned as a gothic church. Since the reformation era, the church has belonged to the Calvinist community. The church was burned down and rebuilt several times. The last significant renovation took place in 1908 after a combustion when the church was rebuilt in neoclassical style. The current furniture in the church is composed of benches and the organ-loft made in neoclassical style, and the neobaroque pulpit. The furniture and the front-door were made by local masters. The church is being reconstructed at the moment. During these works a walled up door turned up again from under the old plaster.

Twinnings 
 Reci, Romania

Picture gallery

See also
 List of municipalities and towns in Slovakia

References

Genealogical resources

The records for genealogical research are available at the state archive "Statny Archiv in Bratislava, Slovakia"
 Roman Catholic church records (births/marriages/deaths): 1872-1898 (parish B)
 Reformated church records (births/marriages/deaths): 1804-1902 (parish A)

External links
Official village website 
Local church plan
Google maps
Csirizke Children Folk Dance Group
Surnames of living people in Cilizska Radvan

Villages and municipalities in Dunajská Streda District
Hungarian communities in Slovakia